Jukka-Pekka Metsola (born 13 May 1954) is a Finnish judoka. He competed in the men's half-middleweight event at the 1988 Summer Olympics.

References

1954 births
Living people
Finnish male judoka
Olympic judoka of Finland
Judoka at the 1988 Summer Olympics
Sportspeople from Tampere